Alopoglossus angulatus, known commonly as the northern teiid, is a species of lizard in the family Alopoglossidae. The species is endemic to northern South America.

Geographic range
A. angulatus is found in Brazil, Colombia, Ecuador, French Guiana, Guyana, Peru, and Suriname.

Habitat

Reproduction
A. angulatus is oviparous.

References

Further reading
Köhler G, Diethert H-H, Veselý M (2012). "A Contribution to the Knowledge of the Lizard Genus Alopoglossus (Squamata: Gymnophthalmidae)". Herpetological Monographs 26 (1): 173–188. 
Linnaeus C (1758). Systema naturæ per regna tria naturæ, secundum classes, ordines, genera, species, cum characteribus, differentiis, synonymis, locis. Tomus I. Editio Decima, Reformata. Stockholm: L. Salvius. 824 pp. (Lacerta angulata, new species, p. 204). (in Latin).
Vitt LJ, Ávila-Pires TCS, Espósito MC, Sartorius SS, Zani PA (2007). "Ecology of Alopoglossus angulatus and A. atriventris (Squamata, Gymnophthalmidae) in western Amazonia". Phyllomedusa 6 (1): 11–21.
Ribeiro-Júnior MA (2018). "A new species of Alopoglossus lizard (Squamata, Alopoglossidae) from the Southern Guiana Shield, northeastern Amazonia, with remarks on diagnostic characters to the genus". Zootaxa 4422 (1): 025–040.

Alopoglossus
Reptiles described in 1758
Taxa named by Carl Linnaeus